Ravindra Varma (9 April 1925 – 10 October 2006) was a Gandhian politician who served as the Minister for Labour and Parliamentary Affairs in the Morarji Desai Ministry in India  from 1977 to 1979.

Politics 

He entered active politics in 1942. He plunged into the vortex of the freedom struggle while studying at the Christian College in Chennai. He was founder-president of the Indian Student Congress and the World Youth Assembly.

He was first elected to the Lok Sabha from Thiruvalla in Kerala in 1962 on a Congress ticket. 
When Congress split in 1969, he stayed on as the General Secretary of Congress (Organisation) founding the organization along with Morarji Desai, Nijalingappa and Kamaraj.  

He was politically active in resisting the Emergency (1975–77) and organized underground cells.  He was next elected in 1977 from Ranchi in Bihar as a Janata Party candidate. He represented Mumbai North in 7th Lok Sabha from 1980 to 1985.

He had been the Chairman of the Gandhi Peace Foundation since the death of its founder-chairman Diwakar in 1989. He was the founder-chairman of the Gandhi Vichar Parishad at Wardha.
He was also Chancellor of the Gujarat Vidyapeeth.

Personal life 

Varma belonged to the royal family in Mavelikkara in southern Kerala. He died in 2006, aged 81. He is survived by his younger son Harshvardhan Varma. His elder son Goutham and wife Mangala died within a span of a few months in 2015.

References

External links 
 

India MPs 1977–1979
India MPs 1980–1984
Lok Sabha members from Bihar
2006 deaths
India MPs 1962–1967
1925 births
Lok Sabha members from Maharashtra
Lok Sabha members from Kerala
Labour ministers of India
People from Alappuzha district
Janata Party politicians
Politicians from Ranchi
Indian National Congress (Organisation) politicians
Indian National Congress politicians
Indian National Congress politicians from Kerala